Eureka is a side-wheel paddle steamboat, built in 1890, which is now preserved at the San Francisco Maritime National Historical Park in San Francisco, California. Originally named Ukiah to commemorate the railway's recent extension into the City of Ukiah, the boat was built by the San Francisco and North Pacific Railroad Company at their Tiburon yard. Eureka has been designated a National Historic Landmark and was listed in the National Register of Historic Places on April 24, 1973.

She is the largest existing wooden ship in the world.

Construction and design 

Ukiah, a wooden-hulled, double-ended ferryboat, was built in 1890 by the San Francisco and North Pacific Railroad Company at their Tiburon shipyard. Her original gross tonnage was 2,564 and net tonnage, 2,018 tons. The ship had a crew of sixteen, whose quarters were in the hold.

According to the National Register of Historic Places, Ukiah was originally built with a main deck for railroad cars and a second deck for passengers above. Numerous contemporaneous newspaper reports, however, state that both the passenger accommodations and railroad cars were located on the main deck. A broad stairway led from this deck to the promenade deck above, where the fore and aft pilot houses, along with staterooms for the officers, were located. Rising from the promenade deck were also several smaller decks for sightseers, accessible only by ladder.

Two standard-gauge railway tracks, on which the railroad cars were transported, were installed the length of the main deck through the center of the ship. Passenger accommodations were located on either side, fore and aft of the paddleboxes, with one side of the ship reserved for female passengers and the other for males. The female side included a moveable partition around the paddlebox that allowed passengers to move between cabins in privacy; this partition could be folded up to make room for railroad cars when required. The passenger decorations on each side differed, with the men's featuring grained panelling, and the women's, "parti colors, with gilt moldings and beadings". Floors on the ladies' side featured velvet carpets, while oilcloths sufficed for the men. At each end of the passenger quarters were vestibules, fitted with doors to prevent drafts. Seats throughout were built of semi-circular strips of cedar and black walnut, separated by black walnut arms. The main deck also featured a bar—located near the engine—toilets and a restaurant. Joinery work throughout the vessel was by Robert Bragg.

The ship was launched in San Francisco Bay on Saturday, May 17, 1890, at 10:40 pm, witnessed by a crowd of about 800 people, many of whom had arrived by a special train from San Rafael.

Service history

Early service 

The ship originally carried people between San Francisco and Tiburon during the day and hauled railroad freight cars at night. On April 16, 1907 she sank at the foot of East Street, San Francisco due to errors in handling the off loading of railroad cars. She was later raised. In 1907, Ukiah was re-routed to the Sausalito–San Francisco Ferry Building route by its new owners, Northwestern Pacific Railroad.

As automobiles became more common, motorists wanted to "drive across the bay". Since there were no bridges on San Francisco Bay at the time, Ukiah was able to meet this demand via a refitted lower deck designed to handle vehicles. The deck above (also enclosed) was expanded for passengers.

World War I and subsequent rebuild 

During World War I, Ukiah carried munition-filled rail cars for the war effort. Overloading of the ship caused hull strains so severe that the government paid for complete rebuilding of the ship. Shipwrights at the Southern Pacific yard labored for two years—eventually replacing all of its structure above the waterline. This kind of reconstruction was called "jacking up the whistle and sliding a new boat underneath." The refurbished ferry was christened Eureka in honor of the Northern California city, which also happened to be the new northern termination of the Northwestern Pacific Railroad.

As a passenger ferry, she could carry 2,300 passengers and 120 automobiles.

1920s through retirement 

Between 1922 and 1941 Eureka was on the Sausalito commuter run. As the largest of the Northwestern boats, Eureka made the heaviest commuter trips - the 7:30 from Sausalito and the 5:15 from San Francisco. Each trip averaged 2,200 passengers. During this period the upper deck included seating areas, a magazine stand, and a restaurant that served full meals.

Eureka was primarily a passenger boat, carrying very few cars. After 1929, though, she sometimes made an extra run from the Hyde Street Pier in San Francisco, carrying autos on Sundays.

Completion of the Golden Gate Bridge between San Francisco and Marin in 1937 doomed ferry service. Northwestern Pacific first cut service, then abandoned ferries altogether in 1941.

During the war years, Eureka joined a number of bay ferries in the work of transporting troops from Camp Stoneman in Pittsburg, California, up the Sacramento River, to the port of embarkation piers in San Francisco.

By the 1950s Eureka served by linking Southern Pacific's cross-country trains, which terminated at Oakland, with San Francisco until 1957, when she snapped an engine crank pin. That service was discontinued the following year. In 1958, Eureka joined the fleet of historic ships now at the National Historical Park.

In the late 1990s she was used as a main filming location for the TV-show Nash Bridges.

In October 1999, Eureka entered San Francisco Drydock for a $1 million restoration project focusing on the vessel's superstructure—the above-water portions of the vessel. A significant portion of that restoration was the replacement of the boat's "kingposts"—four large wooden structures that support the paddlewheels and upper decks.

Design
Although a number of large ferryboats survive in the US, Eureka is the only one with a wooden hull. She is one of the most impressive remaining examples of traditional American wooden shipbuilding.

The house rests on a platform extending  from the hull on either side.

Her walking beam engine was originally powered by coal-fired boilers that were converted to oil in 1905. The engine was built in 1890 by the Fulton Iron Works in San Francisco. Eureka is one of only two surviving vessels equipped with a walking beam engine, alongside the Ticonderoga, and the only one still afloat. 

She was certified to carry 3,500 people.

See also
 Ferries of San Francisco Bay

References
Notes

Bibliography

External links

 

San Francisco Maritime National Historical Park
Ferries of California
Museum ships in San Francisco
Historic American Engineering Record in San Francisco
National Historic Landmarks in the San Francisco Bay Area
Ships on the National Register of Historic Places in California
National Register of Historic Places in San Francisco
Steam ferries
Fisherman's Wharf, San Francisco
1890 ships